Hurricane Ignacio was a Pacific hurricane that threatened Hawaii during July 1985, but ultimately had little impact on the island chain. Ignacio was the eleventh tropical cyclone, ninth named storm, and third hurricane and major hurricane of the very active 1985 Pacific hurricane season. A tropical depression formed on July 21 far from land. It became Tropical Storm Ignacio later that day. Ignacio then rapidly intensified and peaked with 130 mph (215 km/h) winds on July 24. Ignacio weakened quickly, though it briefly leveled off in intensity as a Category 2 hurricane. Ignacio was downgraded into a tropical storm on July 26 while passing south of Hawaii. Continuing to weaken, Ignacio dissipated on July 27. A hurricane watch was briefly issued for the Hawaiian Islands even though the watch was dropped when Ignacio weakened. However, Ignacio still brought high waves and light rainfall to the islands. A few roads were closed, but otherwise, damage was minimal.

Meteorological history

Situated over  sea surface temperatures, the depression attained tropical storm intensity a few hours later. Intensifying further west than normal, the storm reached winds of 70 mph (140 km/h) roughly 24 hours after formation. Nine hours later, the Eastern Pacific Hurricane Center dropped advisories on Ignacio as it had left their area of responsibility and into the Central Pacific Hurricane Center's (CPHC) warning zone.

A Hurricane Hunter aircraft investigated Ignacio at daybreak on July 22, and found that Ignacio had developed a well-defined eye and winds of 85 mph (165 km/h). Based on this, the CPHC upgraded Ignacio to hurricane status. Several hours later, the hurricane attained major hurricane status, Category 3 or higher on the SSHS.

The hurricane held peak intensity for several hours, however, an upper trough northwest of the Hawaiian Islands was gradually approaching Ignacio. Subsequently, the environment was rapidly becoming less conductive as the trough induced increased southwesterly wind shear and introduced colder and drier air into Ignacio's circulation. By 1800 UTC July 24, Ignacio was no longer a major hurricane as satellite imagery suggested that the eye had become irregular and soon disappeared. Air Force aircraft confirmed the weakening trend despite being located in an area where other hurricanes such as Hurricane Dot in 1959 and Hurricane Fico in 1978 maintained their intensity around the same time of the year. Minor re-intensification may have occurred the next day as the eye re-developed, however, this theory is not supported in the hurricane database.

The hurricane resumed its westerly course, and Hurricane Ignacio was downgraded a Category 1 hurricane at 1800 UTC on July 25, and a tropical storm the next day. While passing south of Hawaii, Ignacio dropped to tropical depression status early on July 27, and dissipated shortly after that.

Preparations and impact
Because of a strong trough was located northwest of Ignacio, many tropical cyclone forecast models predicted a more northerly track than what ultimately occurred. By July 24, a high surf advisory was in effect for east-facing shores of Hawaii; subsequently, a hurricane watch was issued at 0300 UTC July 25 for the Big Island of Hawaii Because the island chain only recently recovered from the devastating Hurricane Iwa during the 1982 Pacific hurricane season, civil defense authorities evacuated low-lying residents. One drugstore opened a special hurricane supplies center. In addition, beach activities on south-facing shores were cancelled. Roughly 24 hours after the hurricane watch was issued, the watch was cancelled as Ignacio resumed weakening though a small craft advisory initially remained in effect for the Hawaiian Islands.

Rainfall from the storm was generally light, with a few reports exceeding  on the windward slopes of Maui and the Big Island. Some structures and roads near Kalapana and Kapoh were damaged. Many secondary roads that led to the beaches were closed. Picnic areas and nature trails in Hawaii Volcanoes National Park were closed and overnight camping throughout the state was banned.

See also

List of Pacific hurricanes
1985 Pacific hurricane season
Timeline of the 1985 Pacific hurricane season
Hurricane Estelle (1986)
Hurricane Hector (2018)

References

Ignacio (1985)
Ignacio (1985)
1985 in Hawaii
Ignacio (1985)
Ignacio